The Arena di Monza (formerly the Candy Arena, PalaCandy, PalaIper) is an indoor sporting arena in Monza, Italy. It is home to the Vero Volley Monza (Serie A1) and Saugella Team Monza (Serie A1), volleyball teams. In 2011, it hosted matches for the 2011 Women's European Volleyball Championship. A few rounds of the Men's Volleyball World League were played in the arena in 2008. Its seating capacity is 4,500 spectators.

External links

References

Indoor arenas in Italy
Volleyball venues in Italy
Buildings and structures in Monza
Sports venues in Lombardy
Sports venues completed in 2003
2003 establishments in Italy